The A836 is a major road entirely within the Highland area of Scotland. At 58.648°N where it passes through East Mey, it is the northernmost A-class road in mainland Great Britain.

History
Originally, in 1922, the route was designated from Bonar Bridge to Tongue. By 1935 this had been extended south to Alness and east to John o'Groats. Prior to the opening of the Dornoch Firth Bridge in 1991, the section southeast of Bonar Bridge was part of the A9, and the B9176 from Ardchronie to its then-terminus at Alness was designated as A836. The opening of the bridge removed a  detour around the firth.

Route
As it branches from the A9 near Tain it is a Primary route and runs generally north through Bonar Bridge and Lairg this is where it changes from a primary route to a A-classed road. At Tongue the road turns east, following the north coast, passing through Thurso, and eventually ending at John o' Groats, where it meets the A99.

The A836 passes through some of the loneliest and most sparsely populated parts of Britain, and despite having an 'A' classification, is a single track road in many places. It is a hazardous route in winter owing to the narrow road width, sharp gradients and turns, and is particularly not a recommended route for goods and livestock vehicles, unless strictly necessary.

The North Coast 500 scenic route runs along part of the A836.

References

External links
 SABRE - A836

Roads in Scotland
Transport in Highland (council area)